HD 168592, also designated as HR 6862 or rarely 7 G. Coronae Australis, is a solitary star located in the southern constellation Corona Australis. It is faintly visible to the naked eye as an orange-hued star with an apparent magnitude of 5.07. At its current distance, HD 168592's brightness is diminished by 0.38 magnitudes due to interstellar dust. It has an absolute magnitude of −0.76.

HD 168592 has a stellar classification of K4/5 III, indicating that it is an evolved K-type star with the characteristics of a K4 and K5 giant star. It has a comparable mass to the Sun but the star has expanded to 43.6 times the Sun's radius. HD 168592 is slightly metal deficient with an iron abundance 26% below solar levels.

References

K-type giants
High-proper-motion stars
Corona Australis
Coronae Australis, 7
CD-38 12729
168592
090037
6862